Beatrice Callegari (born 20 December 1991) is an Italian synchronised swimmer. She competed in the team event at the 2016 Summer Olympics. and in Team at the 2020 Summer Olympics.

Callegari is an athlete of the Gruppo Sportivo della Marina Militare.

References

External links
 

1991 births
Living people
Italian synchronized swimmers
Olympic synchronized swimmers of Italy
Synchronized swimmers at the 2016 Summer Olympics
Synchronized swimmers at the 2020 Summer Olympics
World Aquatics Championships medalists in synchronised swimming
Artistic swimmers at the 2019 World Aquatics Championships
European Aquatics Championships medalists in synchronised swimming
European Championships (multi-sport event) bronze medalists
People from Castelfranco Veneto
Artistic swimmers of Marina Militare
Sportspeople from the Province of Treviso